Richard Sturgis Seymour, MVO (21 September 1875 – 21 April 1959) was a British diplomat who served as British Minister to Siam and to Bolivia.

A member of the Seymour family, Richard Seymour was the son of Colonel Leopold Seymour and the grandson of the diplomat Sir George Hamilton Seymour. The courtier Sir Edward Seymour was his brother. Seymour was educated at Eton College and Magdalen College, Oxford.

Seymour entered HM Diplomatic Service in 1898 and served at Berlin, Paris, Teheran, Vienna, St Petersburg, and Copenhagen. He was Secretary of Legation at The Hague from 1915 to 1918, British Minister to Siam from 1919 and 1924 and British Minister to Bolivia from 1924 to 1926.

A poet, Seymour published Rhyme Unreasoned (1938), Shaded Candles (1939), The Marionettes, and Selected Poems: Afterthoughts.

Family 
Seymour married in 1911 Lady Victoria Alexandrina Mabel FitzRoy, daughter of Lord Charles Edward FitzRoy, son of Augustus FitzRoy, 7th Duke of Grafton; they had two sons and a daughter. George Fitzroy Seymour, sometime High Sheriff of Nottinghamshire, was Seymour's son; the writer Miranda Seymour is his granddaughter.

References 

1875 births
1959 deaths
Ambassadors of the United Kingdom to Bolivia
Ambassadors of the United Kingdom to Thailand
Members of HM Diplomatic Service
Seymour family
Members of the Royal Victorian Order
People educated at Eton College
Alumni of Magdalen College, Oxford
Punch (magazine) people
British poets
20th-century British diplomats